Middlesex Community College may refer to the following colleges:
Middlesex Community College (Connecticut)
Middlesex Community College (Massachusetts)
Middlesex County College, Edison, New Jersey